Vallathol is an Indian Malayalam name that may refer to
Vallathol Narayana Menon (1878–1958), Malayalam poet 
Vallathol Award
Vallathol Museum in Thrissur District, India
Vallathol Nagar railway station in Thrissur District, India
Vallathol Unnikrishnan, Malayalam actor
Ravi Vallathol (1952-2020), Malayalam actor

Indian masculine given names